Pauridia is a flowering plant genus in the family Hypoxidaceae. It is native to southern Africa (the Cape Provinces, KwaZulu-Natal, Lesotho and Namibia), and southern Australia (New South Wales, South Australia, Tasmania, Victoria, Western Australia). It has been introduced into New Zealand. The southern African species have been transferred from the genus Spiloxene.

Species
, Plants of the World Online accepted the following species:

Pauridia acida (Nel) Snijman & Kocyan
Pauridia aemulans (Nel) Snijman & Kocyan
Pauridia affinis (Schult. & Schult.f.) Snijman & Kocyan
Pauridia alba (Thunb.) Snijman & Kocyan
Pauridia alticola Snijman & Kocyan
Pauridia aquatica (L.f.) Snijman & Kocyan
Pauridia breviscapa Snijman
Pauridia canaliculata (Garside) Snijman & Kocyan
Pauridia capensis (L.) Snijman & Kocyan
Pauridia curculigoides (Bolus) Snijman & Kocyan
Pauridia etesionamibensis (U.Müll.-Doblies, Mark.Ackermann, Weigend & D.Müll.-Doblies) Snijman & Kocyan
Pauridia flaccida (Nel) Snijman & Kocyan
Pauridia gardneri (R.J.F.Hend.) Snijman & Kocyan
Pauridia glabella (R.Br.) Snijman & Kocyan
Pauridia gracilipes (Schltr.) Snijman & Kocyan
Pauridia linearis (Andrews) Snijman & Kocyan
Pauridia longituba M.F.Thomps.
Pauridia maryae Snijman
Pauridia maximiliani (Schltr.) Snijman & Kocyan
Pauridia minuta (L.f.) T.Durand & Schinz
Pauridia monophylla (Schltr. ex Baker) Snijman & Kocyan
Pauridia monticola Snijman
Pauridia nana (Snijman) Snijman & Kocyan
Pauridia occidentalis (Benth.) Snijman & Kocyan
Pauridia ovata (L.f.) Snijman & Kocyan
Pauridia pudica Snijman
Pauridia pusilla (Snijman) Snijman & Kocyan
Pauridia pygmaea Snijman & Kocyan
Pauridia salina (M.Lyons & Keighery) Snijman & Kocyan
Pauridia scullyi (Baker) Snijman & Kocyan
Pauridia serrata (Thunb.) Snijman & Kocyan
Pauridia trifurcillata (Nel) Snijman & Kocyan
Pauridia umbraticola (Schltr.) Snijman & Kocyan
Pauridia vaginata (Schltdl.) Snijman & Kocyan
Pauridia verna (Hilliard & B.L.Burtt) Snijman & Kocyan

References

External links

Asparagales genera
Hypoxidaceae